Lady Bird is a 2017 American coming-of-age comedy-drama film written and directed by Greta Gerwig in her solo directorial debut. Set in Sacramento, California from fall 2002 to fall 2003, the film tells the story of a high school senior and her strained relationship with her mother. It stars Saoirse Ronan in the title role with Laurie Metcalf, Tracy Letts, Lucas Hedges, Timothée Chalamet, Beanie Feldstein, Stephen McKinley Henderson, and Lois Smith in supporting roles.

Lady Bird premiered at the 44th Telluride Film Festival on September 1, 2017 and was theatrically released in the United States on November 3, 2017, by A24. The film received widespread critical acclaim, with reviewers praising Gerwig's screenplay and direction, and the performances of Ronan and Metcalf. It was considered by many critics as one of the best films of 2017 and one of the best films of the 2010s. Lady Bird was chosen by the National Board of Review, the American Film Institute, and Time magazine as one of the top ten films of 2017. At the 90th Academy Awards, it earned five nominations: Best Picture, Best Actress (for Ronan), Best Supporting Actress (for Metcalf), Best Original Screenplay, and Best Director. At the 75th Golden Globe Awards, the film won two awards—Best Motion Picture (Musical or Comedy) and Best Actress in a Musical or Comedy (for Ronan)—and was nominated for two others. It was also nominated for three British Academy Film Awards.

Plot
In the fall of 2002, Christine McPherson is a senior at the Immaculate Heart of Mary Catholic High School in Sacramento, California. She gives herself the nickname "Lady Bird." Despite her family's financial struggles, she longs to attend a prestigious college in "a city with culture” somewhere on the East Coast. Her mother, Marion, does not believe Christine's dreams are possible and tells her that she is ungrateful for what she has. An argument between them prompts Christine to jump from a moving car, breaking her arm.

Christine and her best friend, Julie, join their school's theater program, where Christine begins dating Danny, who attends the adjacent school for boys. Christine spends her last Thanksgiving before graduation with Danny's wealthy family, instead of her own, much to the disappointment of Marion. After the opening night of the school production of Merrily We Roll Along, Christine and Danny break up when she catches him kissing a boy in a bathroom stall.

At Marion's behest, Christine begins working at a coffee shop, where she meets Kyle, a popular student at the school for boys. Christine abandons tryouts for the new school play to bond with Jenna Walton, a popular student, and they vandalize a nun's car. As she grows closer to Kyle and Jenna, Christine begins spending less time with Julie and drops out of the theater program. She consoles Danny one day when he tearfully expresses his fear of coming out, and they become friends again.

At a house party, Christine and Kyle kiss, and they both confess that they are virgins. After they have sex for the first time, Kyle reveals that he is not actually a virgin, upsetting Christine and prompting her to seek comfort from her mother. After Christine is suspended from school for speaking up at an anti-abortion assembly, Jenna tries to visit her, consequently discovering that Christine had claimed Danny's grandmother's house as her own to impress her. Jenna agrees to forgive her for the lie because of their mutual friendship with Kyle, but their friendship becomes strained.

Christine learns that her father, Larry, has been out of a job and battling depression for years. Despite Marion's insistence that their family cannot afford the fees, Christine secretly applies to East Coast colleges with her father's help. She is accepted into UC Davis but feels it is too close to home. She later learns she is on the wait list for a university in New York City but does not share the news with Marion.

Christine sets out for the prom with Kyle, Jenna, and Jenna's boyfriend, but the latter three decide to go to a house party instead. Christine initially agrees but then asks them to drop her off at Julie's, where the two rekindle their friendship and go to prom together.

After graduation, Danny accidentally mentions the wait list in front of Marion, who stops speaking to Christine for the rest of the summer. Christine gets accepted to the university and her parents take her to the airport, but Marion refuses to go inside to say goodbye. Marion begins crying while leaving the airport and drives back, only to discover that Christine has already gone through security. She cries in Larry's arms and he consoles her.

After arriving in New York, Christine finds several letters addressed to her in her luggage. The letters were written and initially discarded by her mother but secretly collected and passed along by her father. She begins using her given name again and is hospitalized after drinking heavily at a party. Leaving the hospital, she visits a Presbyterian church service and is moved to tears. She calls home and leaves an apologetic voicemail for her mother thanking her for everything she has done for her.

Cast

Production

Development
Gerwig spent years writing the screenplay for “Lady Bird.”  At one point, it was over 350 pages long and had the working title Mothers and Daughters. In 2015, Gerwig and her team secured financing from IAC Films, who produced the film alongside Scott Rudin Productions. Gerwig's manager, Evelyn O'Neill, also served as a producer.

Although the film has been described as "semi-autobiographical", Gerwig has said that "nothing in the movie literally happened in my life, but it has a core of truth that resonates with what I know". To prepare the cast and crew, Gerwig gave them her old high-school yearbooks, photos, and journals, as well as passages written by Joan Didion, and she took them on a tour of her hometown. She told Sam Levy, the director of photography on the film, that she wanted it to feel "like a memory," and said that she "sought to offer a female counterpart to tales like The 400 Blows and Boyhood." The film was Gerwig's first as a solo director.  In 2008, however, she co-wrote and co-directed Nights and Weekends with Joe Swanberg.

Casting
In September 2015, Gerwig met with Saoirse Ronan at the Toronto International Film Festival, where they were promoting Maggie's Plan and Brooklyn, respectively. They read through the script in a hotel room, with Ronan reading the part of Lady Bird, and Gerwig reading the other characters. Gerwig realized, by the second page of the reading, that Ronan was the right choice for the title role. In January 2016, Ronan was cast. Gerwig met with Lucas Hedges and offered him his choice of the male parts. He chose Danny. Gerwig cast Laurie Metcalf after watching her theater work, while the rest of the cast, including Tracy Letts, Timothée Chalamet, Beanie Feldstein, John Karna and Jordan Rodrigues, was announced in September 2016.

Filming
Principal photography was scheduled to begin in March 2016 but was delayed to August, due to Ronan's commitments to a performance of Arthur Miller's The Crucible. Filming began in Sacramento, California on August 30, 2016, for one week. Five weeks were spent on location in Los Angeles, with additional shooting in New York City, and filming wrapped on October 1, 2016. Originally, Gerwig wanted to shoot the film on Super 16 film, but due to budget constraints, she ultimately shot on the Arri Alexa Mini. In post-production, the filmmakers emphasized digital noise, to create the effect of a copy of a photograph.

Ronan dyed her hair red for the role and did not wear makeup to cover her acne.  Of her decision, Ronan has said she saw the film as "an opportunity to let a teenager's face in a movie actually look like a teenager's face in real life". To put the cast and crew at ease by knowing exactly how the day would run, Gerwig, using a technique she learned from filmmaker Rebecca Miller, arrived an hour before everyone else.  She also banned cellphones on the set, which was a policy she borrowed from her partner, filmmaker Noah Baumbach.

Release
In July 2017, A24 acquired worldwide distribution rights to the film. The film had its world premiere at the Telluride Film Festival on September 1, 2017, and screened at the Toronto International Film Festival on September 8, 2017, and at the New York Film Festival on October 8, 2017. Focus Features acquired international distribution rights to the film. It was released theatrically in the United States on November 3, 2017, in the United Kingdom on February 16, 2018, and in Ireland on February 23, 2018.

Reception

Box office
Lady Bird grossed $49 million in the United States and Canada, and $30 million in other territories, for a worldwide total of $79 million.

In its limited opening weekend, it grossed $364,437 from four theaters, for a per-theater average of $91,109. It had the second best theater average of 2017, and the highest ever for a film in limited release directed by a woman. The film expanded to 37 theaters in its second weekend, and grossed a three-day total of $1.2 million, finishing tenth at the box office. In its third weekend, the film expanded to 238 theaters, and grossed a three-day total of $2.5 million, finishing eighth at the box office.

The film had its official wide release on November 24, playing in 724 theaters and making $4.1 million over the weekend ($5.4 million over the five-day Thanksgiving frame), finishing eleventh. Expanding to 1,194 theaters the following week the film grossed $4.3 million, returning to eighth place. Lady Bird also became A24's highest-grossing film domestically, ahead of Moonlight, which made $27.9 million. The weekend of January 27, 2018, following the announcement of the film's five Oscar nominations, it made $1.9 million (an increase over the previous week's $1.1 million).

Critical response
Lady Bird received a standing ovation at its international premiere at the Toronto International Film Festival, and was praised for Ronan and Metcalf's performances, and Gerwig's direction. On Rotten Tomatoes, the film has an approval rating of 99% based on 399 reviews, with an average rating of 8.80/10. The website's critical consensus reads "Lady Bird delivers fresh insights about the turmoil of adolescence and reveals debuting writer-director Greta Gerwig as a fully formed filmmaking talent." On November 27, 2017, it became the most-reviewed film ever to remain at 100% on the site with 164 positive reviews, beating previous record holder Toy Story 2, which had 163 positive reviews at the time. It stayed at 100% until its 196th review was negative. On Metacritic, the film has a weighted average score of 93 out of 100, based on reviews from 50 critics, indicating "universal acclaim."

A.O. Scott of The New York Times described Lady Bird as "big-screen perfection ... exceptionally well-written, full of wordplay and lively argument. Every line sounds like something a person might actually say, which means that the movie is also exceptionally well acted." Todd McCarthy of The Hollywood Reporter wrote the film was "modestly scaled but creatively ambitious" and "succeeds on its own terms as a piquant audience pleaser", and gave praise to Ronan, who he said "just seems to keep getting better all the time." Peter Debruge of Variety praised Gerwig's direction and script as well as Ronan's performance. Mick LaSalle of the San Francisco Chronicle wrote the film was "simply beautiful" and "warm and inspired", hailing the performances of Ronan and Metcalf as well as Gerwig's direction and screenplay.

The Washington Posts Ann Hornaday described the film as a "triumph of style, sensibility and spirit" while similarly praising Ronan's performance and Gerwig's direction. Peter Travers of Rolling Stone rated the film 3.5 out of four stars in which he deemed it as "simply irresistible" and complimented the film's plot and narrative while highlighting the performances of Ronan and Metcalf in which he stated as an "Oscar calling" and Gerwig's direction as "full-blown triumph". He also declared it as one of the year's best films. Richard Roeper of the Chicago Sun-Times called the film "unique and original and fresh and wonderful" and "appealing" while lauding the performances (particularly Metcalf and Letts) in which he remarked that "There’s no level of acting on a higher plane than what [Metcalf] and [Letts] achieve in this film. This is what greatness looks like." Alonso Duralde of TheWrap remarked that "Gerwig the actress skillfully pivots between the wacky and the poignant, so it's no surprise that Gerwig the auteur so delicately balances hilarity and heartbreak".

In Paste, Jim Vorel argued that the film portrays an abusive maternal relationship and noted the similarities of Marion's behavior to those with borderline personality disorder.

Accolades

Lady Bird garnered a variety of awards and nominations. The film was chosen by the National Board of Review, the American Film Institute, and Time magazine as one of the top 10 films of 2017. In 2018, Lady Bird was awarded The ReFrame Stamp in the 2017 Narrative & Animated Feature category.

At the 90th Academy Awards, it was nominated for Best Picture, Best Director and Best Original Screenplay for Gerwig, Best Actress for Ronan, and Best Actress in a Supporting Role for Metcalf. It did not win in any of the five categories in which it was nominated.

The film also received eight nominations at the 23rd Critics' Choice Awards, including Best Picture, Best Director, Best Actress, Best Supporting Actress, Best Original Screenplay, and Best Acting Ensemble. At the 75th Golden Globe Awards, it was nominated for Best Motion Picture – Musical or Comedy (won), Best Actress – Musical or Comedy for Ronan (won), Best Supporting Actress for Metcalf, and Best Screenplay. At the 24th Screen Actors Guild Awards, it was nominated for Outstanding Performance by a Female Actor in a Leading Role for Ronan, Outstanding Performance by a Female Actor in a Supporting Role for Metcalf, and Outstanding Performance by a Cast in a Motion Picture.

In a series of articles regarding the best of the 2010s in film, IndieWire ranked Lady Bird as the 10th best film of the decade. Rolling Stone ranked it 23rd, The A.V. Club ranked it 10th, Business Insider ranked it 5th, and Consequence of Sound ranked it 90th. It was the 13th most overall mentioned on best of decade lists tying with Spider-Man: Into the Spider-Verse according to Metacritic. In 2018, IndieWire writers ranked the script the eighth best American screenplay of the 21st century.

Potential sequels
In February 2018, on an episode of The A24 Podcast, Gerwig expressed interest in making spiritual successors to Lady Bird, saying "I would like to do a quartet of Sacramento films" modeled on the Neapolitan Novels of Elena Ferrante.

See also 
2017 in film
List of American films of 2017
90th Academy Awards
71st British Academy Film Awards
75th Golden Globe Awards
24th Screen Actors Guild Awards
89th National Board of Review Awards
23rd Critics' Choice Awards

Notes

References

External links

 
 
 
 
 
 
 Official screenplay

2017 films
2017 comedy-drama films
2017 directorial debut films
2017 independent films
2017 LGBT-related films
2010s coming-of-age comedy-drama films
2010s feminist films
2010s high school films
2010s teen comedy-drama films
A24 (company) films
American coming-of-age comedy-drama films
American feminist comedy films
American high school films
American teen comedy-drama films
American teen LGBT-related films
Best Musical or Comedy Picture Golden Globe winners
Films about parenting
Films directed by Greta Gerwig
Films featuring a Best Musical or Comedy Actress Golden Globe winning performance
Films produced by Scott Rudin
Films scored by Jon Brion
Films set in 2002
Films set in 2003
Films set in Sacramento, California
Films set in New York City
Films shot in Los Angeles
Films shot in New York City
Films shot in Sacramento, California
Films with screenplays by Greta Gerwig
Gay-related films
Focus Features films
LGBT-related comedy-drama films
LGBT-related coming-of-age films
Films about mother–daughter relationships
National Society of Film Critics Award for Best Film winners
American female buddy films
2010s English-language films
2010s American films